Parque de la Ciudad is a light rail station on the Buenos Aires Premetro. It was opened on 29 April 1987 together with the other Premetro stations. The station is located in the Barrio of Villa Soldati.

At this station, passengers may transfer to the Metrobus Sur BRT line.

References

External links

Buenos Aires PreMetro stations
Buenos Aires Underground stations
Railway stations opened in 1987